"Trucks" is a short story by Stephen King, first published in the June 1973 issue of Cavalier magazine, and later collected in King's 1978 collection Night Shift.

Plot
"Trucks" takes place in a truck stop in the United States. The truck stop is located off a freeway and it features a diner, a gas station, and a convenience store.

The story's narrator and a handful of strangers find themselves trapped together in a freeway truck stop diner after semi-trailers and other large vehicles are suddenly brought to independent life by an unknown force and proceed to gruesomely kill every human in sight. Cars, which remain unaltered, are swiftly battered into wreckage and pedestrians are massacred by rampaging trucks and buses. The six survivors hiding in the diner include the narrator, as well as an elderly counterman, a trucker, a young man named Jerry, his girlfriend, and a salesman named Snodgrass.

As the story begins, the counterman and the trucker attempt to radio any other survivors, but the two-way radio fails for unknown reasons. Snodgrass, cracking under the strain, attempts to flee across the stop's parking lot and is hit by a truck. Snodgrass gets propelled into a drainage ditch, taking hours to die from internal bleeding. The situation worsens when the diner's power goes out. The counterman instructs the survivors that they will need to consume the perishable meats and collect good potable water from the restrooms. While the employee's restroom is inside the diner, the men's and ladies' room are by the outdoor gas station, and the narrator's attempt to gather fresh water from those places nearly costs him his life when the trucks realize what he is trying to do. 

Some time later, a glimmer of hope appears when the trucks begin to run out of fuel. An enormous semi-truck noses up to the diner and starts blasting its horn erratically. Jerry remembers from his time in the Boy Scouts that the horn blasts are Morse code, and translates that the trucks are demanding humans start pumping fuel. The trucks assure they will not attack people who refuel them. The narrator is outvoted when he suggests they comply with this, and a bulldozer arrives and proceeds to attack the diner. The narrator and Jerry destroy the bulldozer with improvised Molotov cocktails, but the diner is half-destroyed and Jerry and the trucker are killed.

The remaining three humans surrender and, taking turns, start pumping the gas into the mile-long string of waiting trucks. When the narrator exhausts the fuel reserve of the truck stop's gas station, a fuel tanker arrives to replenish the fuel cisterns. When the narrator is at a point of collapsing, he is relieved by the counterman, who starts pumping gas for his "shift". The narrator says that he will have to show the girl how to handle a fuel pump, and that she will do it because she wants to live. The narrator thinks to himself that perhaps this will last only until the trucks run out of fuel, rust, and fall apart, but he then has a grim vision of forced assembly lines churning out new generations of trucks, and the trucks, aided by construction vehicles and tanks, doing great efforts such as draining the Okefenokee Swamp and paving much of the wild backcountry, stamping it into a great plain. The story ends as a pair of planes fly overhead, and the narrator laments "I wish I could believe there are people in them."

Adaptations
The story has been adapted into two films. In 1986, it was adapted for cinema with the King-directed Maximum Overdrive. In 1997, it was adapted again as the TV movie Trucks, starring Timothy Busfield, which was made on a considerably smaller budget than Maximum Overdrive but was much more faithful to the original story.

See also
 Stephen King short fiction bibliography

External links
 The story at HorrorKing.com
 

1973 short stories
Horror short stories
Short stories adapted into films
Short stories by Stephen King
Works originally published in Cavalier (magazine)